Museo dell'Opera del Duomo may refer to:

 The Museo dell'Opera del Duomo (Florence)
 The Museo dell'Opera del Duomo of Orvieto
 The Museo dell'Opera del Duomo of Perugia
 The Museo dell'Opera del Duomo of Pisa
 Prato Cathedral Museum
 The Museo dell'Opera del Duomo (Siena)

Art museums and galleries in Italy